The 2006 NAIA football season was the component of the 2006 college football season organized by the National Association of Intercollegiate Athletics (NAIA) in the United States. The season's playoffs, known as the NAIA Football National Championship, culminated with the championship game on December 16, at Jim Carroll Stadium in Savannah, Tennessee. The Sioux Falls Cougars defeated the Saint Francis Cougars, 23–19 in the title game to win the program's second NAIA championship.

Conference standings

Postseason

Rankings

References